White Death is a 1936 Australian film directed by Edwin G. Bowen and starring Zane Grey as himself. He filmed it during a fishing expedition to Australia and it marked the first time he had played a leading role in a film.

Synopsis
Zane Grey bets he can catch a fish bigger than one he sees at Watsons Bay. He hears about a large shark, nicknamed "white death", terrorising the Queensland coast and goes to catch it. He is thwarted by the comic attempts of Newton Smith, a representative of the Wallanga Branch of Fish Protectors, to persuade Grey not to harm fish. There is also a romance between two young people. Eventually Grey manages to catch the shark.

Cast
 Zane Grey as himself
 Alfred Frith as Newton Smith
 Nola Warren as Nola Murchinson
 Harold Calonna as David Murchison
 John Weston as John Lollard
 James Coleman as Professor Lollard
Peter Williams as boatman
Frank Big Belt as guard

Production
In 1935-36 Zane Grey made a fishing expedition to Australia. This trip was extensively covered by the local media and Grey was often accompanied on his sea voyages by three cameramen he had brought out from America, including H.C. Anderson. Grey's activities were criticised at the time by the Royal Society for the Prevention of Cruelty to Animals.

Barrier Reef Productions, a production company capitalised at £15,000, was formed in 1936 to make the film.

The story was inspired by Grey seeing a great white shark (which he nicknamed "white death") being captured near Bermagui in New South Wales. Frank Harvey was hired to write the screenplay. The story drew on Grey's real-life experiences with the character of Newon Smith sending up his treatment at the hands of the RSPCA.

The majority of the film crew came from Cinesound Productions, who also lent equipment to the production. Grey's manager, Edwin G. Bowen, was appointed director of the movie, although he had limited experience behind the camera.

Casting
Alfred Frith, the stage comedian, was hired to play the lead opposite Grey. Nola Warren, a 17-year-old from Watsons Bay with no prior film experience, was cast as the female lead. She performed most of her scenes opposite John Weston, a former schoolboy athletic champion turned radio broadcaster. Aboriginal extras, some of whom had recently appeared in Uncivilised (1936), were brought in from Palm Island, Queensland. Harold Colonna, who played the villain, was best known as an opera singer.

Shooting
Filming started in May 1936 and took place in the Great Barrier Reef, principally at Hayman Island. A shark enclosure was built at Hayman to shoot shark footage.

Bad weather made the shoot difficult. A member of the camera crew sprinkled oil in the surf thinking it would make it sound less loud. A petrol lamp blew up in John Weston's face. In addition, finding white sharks proved difficult, forcing the props master to construct an artificial one from wood and canvas.

Both Bowen and Frith were accompanied by their wives, who assisted in making the movie, and Bowen's young children Buddy and Barbara.

Location shooting ended in July 1936 and the rest of the film was made at Cinesound's studios in Sydney.

Reception
Grey left Australia on 19 August claiming it was the greatest country he had visited. He reportedly offered Nola Warren a film contract and announced he would return in 1938 to make another film. Grey did return to Australia in 1939 to fish, shortly before his death, but no further films resulted. In 1937 he published An American Angler in Australia.

The film premiered in October at Moruya and Bateman's Bay, and reached Sydney theatres in November. The critic for The Sydney Morning Herald described it as "a rambling and rather ramshackle film... the script... is almost bare of dramatic action."

The film was released in the UK but does not appear to have been screened commercially in the US.

Barrier Reef Films announced plans to make further feature films, including one revolving around Alfred Firth, but this did not eventuate.

Nola Warren later became a model and was involved in a scandalous divorce case.

References

Bibliography
 Reade, Eric. History and heartburn: the saga of Australian film, 1896-1978. Associated University Presses, 1981.

External links

White Death at National Film and Sound Archive
White Death at Oz Movies
1936 article by Grey about catching a white shark near Bateman's Bay
An American Angler in Australia by Zane Grey at Project Gutenberg Australia

1936 films
Films about sharks
Films directed by Rupert Kathner
Films about shark attacks
Seafaring films
Australian black-and-white films
Australian adventure films
1936 adventure films
Films shot in Australia
Films set in Queensland
1930s English-language films
English-language adventure films